The 2018–19 Sam Houston State Bearkats women's basketball team represented Sam Houston State University during the 2018–19 NCAA Division I women's basketball season. The Bearkats, led by first year head coach Ravon Justice, played their home games at the Bernard Johnson Coliseum as members of the Southland Conference. They finished the season 16–13 overall, 11–7 in Southland play to finish in fifth place. As the No. 5 seed in the Southland women's tournament, they were defeated in the first round by Central Arkansas.

Previous season
The Bearkats finished the 2017–18 season 4–23, 1–17 in Southland play to finish in thirteenth place. They failed to qualify for the Southland women's tournament.

On March 7, Welch-Nicholls agreed to part ways. She finished at Sam Houston State with a 12 year record of 119–234. On April 12, former Prairie View A&M head coach Ravon Justice was announced as her replacement.

Roster
Sources:

Schedule
Sources:

|-
!colspan=9 style=| Non–conference games

|-
!colspan=9 style=| Southland Conference regular season

|-
!colspan=9 style=| Southland Women's Tournament

See also
2018–19 Sam Houston State Bearkats men's basketball team

References

Sam Houston Bearkats women's basketball seasons
Sam Houston State
Sam Houston State Bearkats basketball
Sam Houston State Bearkats basketball